Yalak may refer to:

 Yalak, Republic of Dagestan, Russia
 Yalak, Ceyhan, Turkey
 Yalak, İskilip, Turkey